Charles Alexander (Karl Alexander August Johann; 24 June 1818 – 5 January 1901) was the ruler of Saxe-Weimar-Eisenach as its grand duke from 1853 until his death.

Biography
Born in Weimar, he was the second but eldest surviving son of Karl Frederick, Grand Duke of Saxe-Weimar-Eisenach and Grand Duchess Maria Pavlovna of Russia. His mother engaged as tutor for Karl the Swiss scholar Frédéric Soret who became a close acquaintance to Johann Wolfgang von Goethe.

When he was the Hereditary Grand Duke, Karl Alexander established a strong friendship with Fanny Lewald and Hans Christian Andersen, but this close relationship stopped in 1849 for the war against Denmark over the duchies of Schleswig-Holstein (the First German-Danish War). On 8 July 1853 his father died, and Karl Alexander became Grand Duke; but he stopped his constitutional accession until Goethe's birthday, on 28 August 1853.

The Danish author and poet Hans Christian Andersen was reportedly infatuated with Karl Alexander, writing "I quite love the young duke, he is the first of all princes that I really find attractive".
Karl Alexander renovated Wartburg Castle, and left his traces in many places in Eisenach. He was the protector of Richard Wagner and Franz Liszt, retained the tradition of Weimar's classical period, and gave the old part of Weimar a new and better appearance with the establishment of the Herder monument, and the double monument for Goethe and Schiller. In 1860, he founded the Weimar Saxon-Grand Ducal Art School (with Arnold Böcklin, Franz von Lenbach and the plastic artist Reinhold Begas). As Grand Duke he was automatically rector, president of Jena University where he supported especially the collections among them prominently the Oriental Coin Cabinet.

In the Franco-Prussian War (1870–1871), Karl Alexander participated only in "Samaritan"; stressed, however, for his war entrance in favor of Schleswig in 1849. The Weimar Congress of the Goethe Federation (opposing the Lex Heinze) occurred towards the end of his reign, in November 1900 - that congress described his government as the Silver Age of Weimar.

He died at Weimar in 1901. Following his death, he was succeeded as Grand Duke by his grandson Wilhelm Ernst, his only son Carl August having predeceased him.

Family and children

At Kneuterdijk Palace in The Hague, on 8 October 1842, Karl Alexander married with his first cousin, Princess Sophie of the Netherlands, daughter of William II and Grand Duchess Anna Pavlovna of Russia, sister of his mother. They had four children:
Karl August Wilhelm Nicolaus Alexander Michael Bernhard Heinrich Frederick Stefan, Hereditary Grand Duke of Saxe-Weimar-Eisenach (b. Weimar, 31 July 1844 – d. Cap Martin, France, 20 November 1894).
Marie Anna Alexandrine Sophie Auguste Helene (b. Weimar, 20 January 1849 – d. Trebschen, 6 May 1922), known as Marie; married on 6 February 1876 to Prince Heinrich VII Reuss of Köstritz.
Maria Anna Sophia Elisabeth Bernhardine Ida Auguste Helene (b. Weimar, 29 March 1851 – d. Weimar, 26 April 1859), known as Anna.
Elisabeth Sibylle Maria Dorothea Anna Amalie Luise (b. Weimar, 28 February 1854 – d. Wiligrad, 10 July 1908), known as Elisabeth; married on 6 November 1886 to Duke Johann Albrecht of Mecklenburg-Schwerin.

Honours and awards
He received the following awards:
German honours

Foreign honours

Ancestry

References

External links

1818 births
1901 deaths
People from Saxe-Weimar-Eisenach
Princes of Saxe-Weimar-Eisenach
Protestant monarchs
Hereditary Grand Dukes of Saxe-Weimar-Eisenach
Nobility from Weimar
Grand Dukes of Saxe-Weimar-Eisenach
Hans Christian Andersen
Grand Crosses of the Order of Saint Stephen of Hungary
Knights of the Golden Fleece of Spain